Mats Ola Rudal (born 28 February 1963 in Östersund, Sweden) is a Swedish actor.

Selected filmography
1997 - Snoken (TV)
1997 - Skilda världar (TV)
1999 - Sjön
2002 - Cleo
2002 - Beck – Kartellen
2003 - Kvarteret Skatan (TV)
2005 - Kommissionen (TV)
2005 - Kvalster (TV)
2006 - Kronprinsessan (TV)
2006 - Wallander – Luftslottet
2007 - Pyramiden
2007 - Ett gott parti (TV)
2008 - Livet i Fagervik (TV)
2008 - Oskyldigt dömd (TV)

References

External links

Swedish Film Database

People from Östersund
Swedish male actors
1963 births
Living people